The Conodont Alteration Index (CAI) is used to estimate the maximum temperature reached by a sedimentary rock using thermal alteration of conodont fossils. Conodonts in fossiliferous carbonates are prepared by dissolving the matrix with weak acid, since the conodonts are composed of apatite and thus do not dissolve as readily as carbonate. The fossils are then compared to the index under a microscope. The index was first developed by Anita Epstein and colleagues at the United States Geological Survey.

The CAI ranges from 1 to 6, as follows:

The CAI is commonly used by paleontologists due to its ease of measurement and the abundance of Conodonta throughout marine carbonates of the Paleozoic. Additionally, the index can be positively skewed in regions of hydrothermal alteration.

See also
 Foraminiferal Colouration Index (FCI)

References

 Epstein, A., Epstein, J., Harris, L. (1977). "Conodont Color Alteration - an Index to Organic Metamorphism." United States Geological Survey Professional Paper 995, 1-27.
  (Image)

Conodonts
Fossil record of animals
Geochemistry
Sedimentology